John A. Rowland High School is a public, four-year high school and International Baccalaureate (IB) World School in the city of Rowland Heights, California, United States. It is one of the two high schools in the Rowland Unified School District. It is located directly across from one of the district's elementary schools, Killian Elementary School.

Rowland High School received a six-year WASC accreditation in 2007 as well as being named a California Distinguished School in 1996 and 2004, and a National Blue Ribbon School in 1998. Rowland High School was named a Gold Ribbon School in 2017.

Renovation
The school entered a period of building and renovating; the initial conceptual designs were presented in 2013, and the process of modernization started in 2017. Renovations planned for the high school include additional new buildings, such as a two-story classroom building, a two-story building that will replace the existent administration and library building, a multipurpose room, and a new performing arts center, among other upgrades. The project was completed in  September 2019.

Athletics
Rowland participates in the Hacienda League of the CIF Southern Section.

CIF Southern Section Championships
 Boys' basketball (1976)
 Boys' gymnastics (1982)
 Boys' cross country (1988)
 Boys' water polo (1994, 1995, 1997, 1998, 1999, 2000)
 Girls' water polo (2003, 2004)
 Girls' soccer (1997)
 Girls' swimming (2018)
 Boys' swimming (2017, 2018)

Notable alumni
 Lanhee Chen (1995) - Policy Director of the Mitt Romney presidential campaign, 2012 and Romney's chief policy adviser; Senior Adviser of the Marco Rubio presidential campaign, 2016; member of the U.S. Social Security Advisory Board
 Mark Crear (1987) -   two-time Olympic medalist; ordained minister
 Dave Hansen (1986) - Major League Baseball player
 Mike Hohensee (1979) - former Head Coach of the Albany Firebirds; current Head Coach of the Chicago Rush
 Al Martin (1985) - Major League Baseball player
 Aja Naomi King (2003) -Actress (How to Get Away With Murder, The Birth of a Nation) and Spokesperson for L’Oréal.

References

External links
 Rowland High School

High schools in Los Angeles County, California
International Baccalaureate schools in California
Public high schools in California
1964 establishments in California